Thomas Tallman (June 12, 1815 – October 9, 1872) was an American minister and politician.

Tallman, son of Eleazar and Susan Tallman, was born in the parish of Middle Haddam (in Chatham), Conn., June 12, 1815.

He graduated Yale College in 1837.  He studied theology in Yale Theological Seminary for three years after leaving college, and was ordained pastor of the Congregational Church in Scotland, Conn., March 20, 1844. From this charge he was dismissed, June 26, 1861. From July, 1861, to Nov., 1863, he supplied the pulpit of the Congregational Church in Groton, Conn. In 1864, he removed to Thompson, Conn., and there resided until his death, in the interval preaching in Westminster (in 1864-65), and in East Putnam (from April, 1868, to Nov., 1869), He was a member of the Connecticut State House of Representatives in the sessions of 1866 and 1867. He died, after great sufferings, Oct 9th, 1872, from the effects of a cartilaginous tumor, which had been forming in the abdomen for more than three years.

Tallman was married, May 17, 1842, to Frances M., daughter of Simon Hazleton, of Haddam. She died July 30, 1860. He was again married, April 27, 1864, to Hannah C. Graves, of Thompson, who survived him.  His children were a son and a daughter by his first, and a son and a daughter by his second marriage. The elder son graduated Yale in 1867.

External links

1815 births
1872 deaths
Yale Divinity School alumni
People from East Hampton, Connecticut
Members of the Connecticut House of Representatives
American Congregationalist ministers
19th-century American politicians
19th-century American clergy